This is a list shadow holders of the Great Offices of State in the United Kingdom's Official Opposition Shadow Cabinet since Hugh Gaitskell's Shadow Cabinet of 1955. The purpose of the Shadow Cabinet is to scrutinise the opposing ministers, develop alternate policies, and hold the government to account for its actions in a form of checks and balances. The Opposition Shadow Cabinet is made up of about 20 ministers from the largest opposition party.

List

†Died in office
‡Served as interim leader

See also
 Official Opposition (United Kingdom)
 Official Opposition Shadow Cabinet (United Kingdom)
 Official Opposition frontbench
 List of British shadow cabinets

Official Opposition (United Kingdom)